(22 October 1901 – 22 October 1980) was a Japanese film director. He directed films from the 1930s to 1950s, especially jidaigeki and ghost movies based on kaidan.

Filmography 
Ryohei Arai directed 47 films:
 Tsubanari Ronin (1939)
 Zoku Tsubanari Ronin (1940)
 Ghost-Cat of Arima Palace (Kaibyō Arima ) (1953)
 Ghost of Saga Mansion (Kaidan Saga yashiki) (1953)
 (赤穂義士 Akō gishi) (1954)

References 

Japanese film directors
1901 births
1980 deaths